Jacobo is both a surname and a given name of Spanish origin. Based on the name Jacob. Notable people with the name include:

Surname:
Alfredo Jacobo (born 1982), Olympic breaststroke swimmer from Mexico
Cesar Chavez Jacobo, Dominican professional basketball player
Clara Jacobo, Italian opera singer

Given name:
Jacobo Majluta Azar (born 1934), politician from Dominican Republic, was president for 43 days
Jacobo Arenas (1924–1990), Colombian guerrilla and ideological leader of FARC
Dan Jacobo Beninson (1931–2003), Argentine radiation expert
Jacobo Bolbochán (1906–1984), Argentine chess master
Jacobo Borges (born 1931), contemporary, neo-figurative Latin-American artist
Jacobo Díaz (born 1976), former professional male tennis player from Spain
Juan Jacobo Fernandez (1808–1860), Franciscan friar, a martyr who achieved beatification
Jacobo Fijman (1898–1970), Argentine poet born in Bessarabia, now mainly in Moldova
Jacobo Fitz-James Stuart, 17th Duke of Alba (1878–1953), Spanish noble, diplomat, politician and art collector
Jacobo Fitz-James Stuart, 5th Duke of Liria and Jérica (1773–1794), Spanish nobleman
Jacobo Fitz-James Stuart, 6th Duke of Liria and Jérica (1792–1795), the second surviving son of the 5th Duke of Berwick
Jacobo Árbenz Guzmán (1913–1971), Guatemalan military officer and politician
Jacobo Mansilla (born 1987), Argentine football midfielder
Jacobo Morales (born 1934), Puerto Rican actor, writer and film director
Jacobo Sanz Ovejero (born 1983), Spanish football goalkeeper
Jacobo Pacchiarotto, 16th-century Italian painter of the Renaissance period
Jacobo Palm (1887–1982), Curaçao-born composer
Jacobo Rispa, director and freelance producer working mainly in TV drama & film
Jacobo Timerman (1923–1999), publisher, journalist, and author
Jacobo Kyushei Tomonaga (1582–1633), Japanese Roman Catholic priest and martyr
Jacobo Arbenz Villanova (born 1946), politician in Guatemala
Jacobo Ynclán (born 1984), Spanish football midfielder
Jacobo Zabludovsky (born 1928), Mexican journalist

See also
Jacobo Hunter District, one of the twenty-nine districts of the Arequipa Province in Peru
Jacobo Ortis, 1916 Italian silent drama film based on the novel Le ultime lettere di Jacopo Ortis by Ugo Foscolo
Que No Te Haga Bobo Jacobo, song by the Mexican rock band Molotov from their début album Dónde Jugarán las Niñas